Pac-12 Conference Defensive Player of the Year may refer to:
Pac-12 Conference Football Defensive Player of the Year
Pac-12 Conference Men's Basketball Defensive Player of the Year